Sam Benjamin McCallum (born 2 September 2000) is an English professional footballer who plays as a defender for Championship club Norwich City.

Career

Early career
McCallum was born in Canterbury, Kent and grew up in the nearby seaside town of Herne Bay. He attended Simon Langton Grammar School for Boys in Canterbury. McCallum started his career at non-League club Herne Bay before moving to League One club Coventry City in August 2018 after being at Jamie Vardy's V9 Academy.

In November 2018, he made his debut in an EFL Trophy defeat against Cheltenham Town coming on as an 81st minute substitute for Brandon Mason.

McCallum broke through into the Coventry first team and made a total of 35 appearances and scoring three goals.

Norwich City
On 31 January 2020, McCallum signed for Norwich City for a reported fee of £3,500,000 and was immediately loaned back to Coventry until the end of the season. Norwich signed McCallum amid interest from other Premier League teams such as Liverpool and Leicester City.

On 20 September 2020, McCallum was loaned to Coventry for the 2020–21 season for his third spell with the club.

On 12 July 2021, McCallum again returned to the Championship, joining Queens Park Rangers on loan for the duration of the 2021–22 season. He scored his first goal for QPR against Bournemouth on 14 September 2021.

Career statistics

References

2000 births
Living people
Sportspeople from Canterbury
People educated at Simon Langton Grammar School for Boys
Footballers from Kent
English footballers
Association football defenders
Herne Bay F.C. players
V9 Academy players
Coventry City F.C. players
Norwich City F.C. players
Queens Park Rangers F.C. players
English Football League players